PowerMapper is a web crawler that automatically creates a site map of a website using thumbnails of each web page.

Map styles
Site maps are the website directories which can be easily fetch by the Web crawlers in order to learn the websites pages and links. Site maps can be displayed in a number of different map styles which arrange sites into a tree structure. Some styles display thumbnails for each page, others use text-only presentation. Map styles include:

 Electrum  a simple thumbnail map style
 Electrum 2.0  a variation of the Electrum style that works better on larger sites
 Isometric  a thumbnail map style using a pseudo-3D isometric projection
 Page Cloud  a thumbnail map style with pages clustered into 3D clouds
 Skyscrapers  an abstract representation of pages that looks like city blocks 
 Thumbtree  a hierarchical thumbnail map style
 Table Map  a plain text list of pages in a table
 Table of Contents  a plain text list of pages
 Tree View  an expanding table of contents

Site maps can also be exported in XML sitemaps format for use by the Google, Yahoo and MSN search engines.

Reviews
The product received positive reviews from a greater community for the 1.0 release in 1997, and subsequent reviews for the 4.0 release in Microsoft TechNet Magazine.

See also
 Site map, a graphical representation of the architecture of a web site
 Sitemaps, a standard for URL inclusion in search engines

References

Web crawlers